Little Vegas is a 1990 American romantic comedy-drama film directed by Perry Lang and starring Anthony Denison, Catherine O'Hara and Lang.

Cast
Anthony Denison
Catherine O'Hara
Jerry Stiller
Michael Nouri
Perry Lang
Bruce McGill
John Sayles
Jay Thomas
Bobcat Goldthwait

Reception
Leonard Maltin awarded the film two stars.

References

External links
 
 

American comedy-drama films
American romantic comedy films
Films produced by Peter MacGregor-Scott
Films directed by Perry Lang